The canton of Vallée de l'Isle is an administrative division of the Dordogne department, southwestern France. It was created at the French canton reorganisation which came into effect in March 2015. Its seat is in Neuvic.

It consists of the following communes:

Beaupouyet
Beauronne
Bourgnac
Chantérac
Douzillac
Les Lèches
Mussidan
Neuvic
Saint-Aquilin
Saint-Étienne-de-Puycorbier
Saint-Front-de-Pradoux
Saint-Germain-du-Salembre
Saint-Jean-d'Ataux
Saint-Laurent-des-Hommes
Saint-Louis-en-l'Isle
Saint-Martin-l'Astier
Saint-Médard-de-Mussidan
Saint-Michel-de-Double
Saint-Séverin-d'Estissac
Sourzac
Vallereuil

References

Cantons of Dordogne